Edward Ignacio Araya Cortés (born 14 February 1986 in Antofagasta) is a Chilean race walker. He competed in the 50 kilometres walk event at the 2012 Summer Olympics. His personal best of 3:58:54 hours for the 50 kilometres walk is the Chilean record for the event.
He represented his country at the 2013 World Championships in Athletics and has twice competed at the IAAF World Race Walking Cup (2010 and 2012). He entered the 2011 Pan American Games but was disqualified in the competition. He has raced at the South American Race Walking Championships on four occasions (2004, 2004, 2008, 2010) but has not won a medal there.

He has a twin brother, Yerko, who is also a racewalker.

Competition record

References

1986 births
Living people
People from Antofagasta
Chilean male racewalkers
Olympic athletes of Chile
Athletes (track and field) at the 2012 Summer Olympics
Athletes (track and field) at the 2016 Summer Olympics
Pan American Games competitors for Chile
Athletes (track and field) at the 2011 Pan American Games
World Athletics Championships athletes for Chile
Twin sportspeople
Chilean twins